A county commission (or a board of county commissioners) is a group of elected officials (county commissioners) collectively charged with administering the county government in some states of the United States; such commissions usually comprise three to five members. In some counties within Georgia, however, a sole commissioner holds the authority of the commission.

In parts of the United States, alternative terms such as County Board of Supervisors or County Council may be used in lieu of, but generally synonymous to, a County Commission.  However, in some jurisdictions there may be distinct differences between a County Commission and other similarly titled bodies.  For example, a County Council may differ from a County Commission by containing more members or by having a Council-Manager form of government.  In Indiana, every county, except Marion, which is consolidated with Indianapolis, has both a County Commission and a County Council, with the County Commission having administrative authority and the County Council being responsible for fiscal matters. 

Each commission acts as the executive of the local government, levying local taxes, administering county governmental services such as correctional institutions, courts, public health oversight, property registration, building code enforcement, and public works (e.g. road maintenance). The system has been supplanted in large part, as disparate sparsely-settled regions become urbanized and establish tighter local governmental control, usually in municipalities, though in many of the more rural states, the county commission retains more control, and even in some urbanized areas, may be responsible for significant government services.

Various counties nationwide have explored expanding from three members to five.

History
William Penn, colonial founder of Pennsylvania is credited with originating the system of County Commissioners in the United States.

On February 28, 1681, Charles II granted a charter for a proprietary colony to William Penn to repay a debt of £16,000 (around £2,100,000 in 2008 currency, adjusting for retail inflation) owed to William's father, Admiral William Penn. This was one of the largest land grants made in history, to one individual. The colony was to be called Pennsylvania. Penn established a government with two innovations that were much copied in the New World: the county commission, and freedom of religious conviction.

New Jersey previously referred to county commissioners as freeholders, but its practice ended in 2021.

By state 

Board of County Commissioners (New Jersey; formerly known as the Board of chosen freeholders)
Board of County Commissioners (Ohio)
Commissioners' Court (Texas and Missouri; identical concept known in Arkansas as "Quorum Court")
Fiscal Court (Kentucky)
Police Jury (Louisiana)
Sole commissioner (some counties in Georgia)

See also
County board of supervisors
County council
County executive

References and footnotes

County governing bodies in the United States